Thomas Courtney Locke was a college football player and for eight years was adjutant general of Alabama.

Auburn University
He was a prominent guard for the Auburn Tigers of Auburn University from 1907 to 1909.

1908
In the 10 to 2 loss against LSU in 1908, Locke blocked the punt which Doc Fenton recovered for a safety. He was also captain of the basketball team.

1909
He was selected All-Southern in 1909.

References

All-Southern college football players
Auburn Tigers football players
American football guards
Auburn Tigers men's basketball players
American men's basketball players